Braulio Ávila Juárez (born March 5, 1986 in Chiautempan, Tlaxcala) is a Mexican amateur boxer best known for winning bronze medals in flyweight at the 2006 Central American and Caribbean Games and both 2007 and 2011 Pan American Games.

Career
At the 2006 Central American and Caribbean Games the pressure fighter won bronze when he lost to Yoandri Salinas 6:9.

He easily qualified for the PanAm Games even though he lost the final of his qualifier to Yoandri Salinas, at the main event he lost to Juan Carlos Payano 4:20 in the semis and won bronze.

At the 2007 World Championships he reached the second round by beating Jackson Chauke but lost to eventual winner Rau'shee Warren

References

 2006
 PanAm
 2007 World Championships
 data

1986 births
Living people
Boxers from Tlaxcala
Flyweight boxers
Boxers at the 2007 Pan American Games
Boxers at the 2011 Pan American Games
Mexican male boxers
Pan American Games bronze medalists for Mexico
Pan American Games medalists in boxing
Central American and Caribbean Games bronze medalists for Mexico
Competitors at the 2006 Central American and Caribbean Games
People from Chiautempan
Central American and Caribbean Games medalists in boxing
Medalists at the 2007 Pan American Games
Medalists at the 2011 Pan American Games
21st-century Mexican people